Gait Analysis: Normal and Pathological Function is a textbook that focuses on human gait analysis and is written by Jacquelin Perry and Judith M. Burnfield. It is an updated and revised version of Gait Analysis: Normal and Pathological Function (1992), a text many consider to be a staple for the curriculum of education of gait analysis. It is frequently cited in academic publications as well as journals for orthopedics, physical therapy and athletic training.

Editions 

 (2010) 2nd edition. Thorofare, New Jersey: SLACK Incorporated. .

References

External links
Official site

2010 non-fiction books
American non-fiction books
Terrestrial locomotion
Biology textbooks